, also known as Somedono no Daijin or Shirakawa-dono, was a Japanese statesman, courtier and politician during the Heian period.

When Yoshifusa's grandson was enthroned as Emperor Seiwa, Yoshifusa assumed the role of regent (sesshō) for the young monarch.  He was the first sesshō in Japanese history who was not himself of imperial rank; and he was the first of a series of regents from the Fujiwara clan.

Career
He was a minister during the reigns of Emperor Ninmyō, Emperor Montoku and Emperor Seiwa.

 834 (Jōwa 1, 9th day of the 7th month): Sangi
 835 (Jōwa 2): Gon-no-Chūnagon
 840 (Jōwa 7): Chūnagon
 842 (Jōwa 9): Dainagon
 848 (Saikō 1, 1st month): Udaijin
 857 (Saikō 4, 19th day of the 2nd month): Daijō Daijin
 858 (Ten'an 2, 7th day of the 11th month): Sesshō for Emperor Seiwa.
 October 7, 872 (Jōgan 14, 2nd day of the 9th month): Yoshifusa died at the age of 69.

Yoshifusa conceived the programme of boy-sovereigns with Fujiwara regents; and his adopted son, Mototsune, carried out the plans.

Genealogy
This member of the Fujiwara clan was the son of Fujiwara no Fuyutsugu.  Yoshifusa's brothers were  Fujiwara no Nagayoshi, Fujiwara no Yoshisuke and Fujiwara no Yoshikado.

Marriages and children
He was married to Minamoto no Kiyohime (源 潔姫), daughter of Emperor Saga.

They had only one daughter.
 Akirakeiko/Meishi (明子) (829–899), consort of Emperor Montoku

He adopted his brother Nagara's third son.
Mototsune (基経) (836–891) – Daijō Daijin and Kampaku

Yoshifusa is referred to as Chūjin Kō (忠仁公) (posthumous title was Daijō Daijin).

See also
Fujiwara Regents
 Shoku Nihon Kōki, one of the Six National Histories of Japan; edited by Fujiwara no Yoshifusa.

Notes

References
 Brinkley, Frank and Dairoku Kikuchi. (1915). A History of the Japanese People from the Earliest Times to the End of the Meiji Era. New York: Encyclopædia Britannica. 
 Brown, Delmer M. and Ichirō Ishida, eds. (1979).  Gukanshō: The Future and the Past. Berkeley: University of California Press. ; 
  Hioki, S. (1990). Nihon Keifu Sōran. Tokyo: Kōdansya.
  Kasai, M. (1991). Kugyō Bunin Nenpyō. Tokyo: Yamakawa Shuppan-sha
  Kodama, K. (1978). Nihon-shi Shō-jiten, Tennō. Tokyo: Kondō Shuppan-sha.
 Nussbaum, Louis-Frédéric and Käthe Roth. (2005).  Japan encyclopedia. Cambridge: Harvard University Press. ; 
  Owada, T. et al. (2003). Nihonshi Shoka Keizu Jimmei Jiten. Tokyo: Kōdansya.
 Titsingh, Isaac. (1834). Nihon Odai Ichiran; ou,  Annales des empereurs du Japon.  Paris: Royal Asiatic Society, Oriental Translation Fund of Great Britain and Ireland. 

804 births
872 deaths
Sesshō and Kampaku
Fujiwara clan
Regents of Japan
People of Heian-period Japan